The Mayor of Carterton is the mayor of the Carterton District, which is administered by Carterton District Council, and earlier the office oversaw the Carterton Borough from 1887 until 1989, when Carterton Borough and Wairarapa South County were amalgamated to form Carterton District.

The current Mayor of Carterton is Ron Mark who was elected in 2022, he has previously held the office from 2010 until 2014, when he was elected as a New Zealand First MP.

Georgina Beyer, New Zealand's first transgender mayor, held the office from 1995 to 1999.

List

References

Carterton